Estadio Metropolitano de Madrid was a multi-use stadium in Madrid, Spain. It was used as the stadium of Atlético Madrid matches before the Vicente Calderón Stadium opened in 1966. The stadium held 35,800 people and was built in 1923, replacing Campo de O'Donnell.

External links
Estadios de Espana 

Defunct football venues in Spain
Atlético Madrid
Former sports venues in Madrid
Sports venues completed in 1923
1923 establishments in Spain
Sports venues demolished in 1966